Indjapyx indicus is a species of forcepstail in the family Japygidae.

Subspecies
These two subspecies belong to the species Indjapyx indicus:
 Indjapyx indicus indicus
 Indjapyx indicus modestus Pagès, 1978

References

Diplura
Articles created by Qbugbot
Animals described in 1891